Olga Ilich (born 1952 or 1953) is a former Canadian politician. Ilich represented the riding of Richmond Centre in the Legislative Assembly of British Columbia from 2005 to 2009. She is a member of the British Columbia Liberal Party.

Ilich served in the Executive Council of British Columbia as Minister of Labour and Citizens' Services. She previously served as Minister of Tourism, Sport and the Arts.

References

External links
Legislative Assembly of British Columbia- Olga Ilich

Year of birth missing (living people)
Living people
British Columbia Liberal Party MLAs
Women government ministers of Canada
Members of the Executive Council of British Columbia
Women MLAs in British Columbia
21st-century Canadian politicians
21st-century Canadian women politicians